The 2001 southern Peru earthquake occurred at 20:33:15 UTC (15:33:15 local time) on June 23 with a moment magnitude of 8.4 and a maximum Mercalli intensity of VIII (Severe). The quake affected the Peruvian regions of Arequipa, Moquegua and Tacna. It was the most devastating earthquake in Peru since the catastrophic 1970 Ancash earthquake and globally the largest earthquake since the 1965 Rat Islands earthquake.

Tectonic setting
Peru lies above the destructive boundary where the Nazca Plate is being subducted beneath the South American Plate along the line of the Peru–Chile Trench. The two plates are converging towards each other at a rate of about 78mm or 3 inches per year.  Southwestern Peru has a history of very large earthquakes. The June 23 shock originated just southeast of the source of a magnitude 7.7 earthquake that occurred in 1996, and it appears to have involved rupture of part of the plate boundary segment that produced an earthquake of magnitude approximately 9.0 in 1868. The 1868 earthquake was destructive in towns that were heavily damaged in the June 23 earthquake. The 1868 earthquake produced a tsunami that killed thousands of people along the South American coast and also caused damage in Hawaii and the only recorded tsunami deaths in New Zealand.

Earthquake
The earthquake occurred as a result of thrust faulting along the plate boundary interface. The initial onset consisted of two events separated by about 6 seconds. It was followed by at least one larger complex event occurring about 40 seconds later. The rupture area as determined from the distribution of aftershocks was 320 km x 100 km. The rupture propagated unilaterally from the hypocenter towards the southeast. The earthquake resulting in many instances of ground failure effects. These ground failure effects included landslides, collapsed drainage banks, ground cracking and more. These failures can have long term effects on the landscape and the local habitats.

Tsunami 
The size and location of the earthquake caused a local tsunami in Peru as well as smaller tsunamis in other countries and on other continents. The magnitude of the local tsunami that was caused by the earthquake was measured as Mt=8.2 by the Earthquake Research Institute and waves from the local tsunami were recorded to be 5 to 8 meters high. The local tsunami that occurred in Peru caused great damage to a 20 km section of coastline located in the municipality of Camana and as a result over 3000 structures were destroyed or damaged, around 5000 acres of farmland were covered in sand. Although great damage occurred to structures in the area, the loss of human life could have been much greater had this event occurred in the summer when the area is highly populated by tourists. Another factor that greatly reduced the loss of life was the fact that a majority of the population is knowledgeable about earthquakes and their resulting tsunamis. Many of the residents felt the earthquake as well as noticed the receding water and had the ability to evacuate to higher ground to avoid the resulting tsunami. The largest non-local tsunamis occurred in Chile and waves reached heights of 257 cm. Other areas that also recorded tsunamis associated with the earthquake include the Galapagos Islands, Mexico, California, Hawaii, Alaska, Fiji, Samoan Islands, Japan, New Zealand, Tonga, and Russia.

Damage and casualties
At least 74 people were killed, including 26 killed by a tsunami. At least 2,687 were injured, 17,510 homes were destroyed and 35,549 homes damaged in the Arequipa-Camana-Tacna area. An additional 64 people were missing due to the tsunami in the Camana-Chala area. Landslides blocked highways in the epicentral area. Many of the historic buildings in Arequipa were damaged or destroyed, including the left tower of the Basilica Cathedral of Arequipa.

Some people were injured and damage was reported in the Arica, Chile area. It was felt in Arica, Iquique, Calama and Tocopilla, Chile. The quake was also felt strongly in much of southern Peru and northern Chile and also in Bolivia. Tsunami runup heights near Camana were estimated from field evidence to have reached approximately 7m at some locations; at other locations, the tsunami inundation distance extended more than 1 km inland from the coast. Tsunami wave heights (peak-to-trough) recorded from selected tide stations: 2.5m at Arica; 1.5m at Iquique; 1.0m at Coquimbo, Chile.

Relief

The Government of Peru and the Peruvian Civil Defense Institute (INDECI) were at the center of relief efforts after the earthquake and tsunami. At least 36,000 homes were damaged with another minimum of 24,000 homes destroyed. This was particularly concerning due to the weather being able to go below freezing temperatures in some of the areas. After a state of emergency was declared in some affected areas on the 24th of June, International assistance was requested by the Government of Peru and a total of $215 million was allocated with $70 million going to relief and $140 million going to reconstruction. Most of the funds were gotten from loans and were split between the different ministries of Government to provide aid and relief efforts. Multilateral Organizations including UNICEF, the United Nations and the International Federation of Red Cross and Red crescent societies. In addition numerous governments provided aid in form of either resources or money. These governments include but are not limited to Argentina, Brazil, Chile, Colombia, Ecuador, Panama, Uruguay, Venezuela, Belgium, France, USA, Canada, Germany, Italy, Japan, Norway, Spain, Sweden, Switzerland, the European Union Humanitarian Aid Office and the United Kingdom.

See also
 List of earthquakes in 2001
 List of earthquakes in Peru

References

External links
  Análisis del Terremoto del Sur del Perú, 23 de Junio 2001, Mw= 8.4 Utilizando Datos Locales

Southern Peru
Southern Peru Earthquake, 2001
Earthquakes in Peru
Megathrust earthquakes in Peru
Tsunamis in New Zealand
June 2001 events in South America
Tsunamis in Peru
2001 disasters in Peru